Jean Baptiste Rousseau may refer to:
 Jean-Baptiste Rousseau (1671–1741), French playwright and poet
 Jean Baptiste Rousseau (fur trader) (1758–1812), influential fur trader and interpreter in Upper Canada
 Jean-Baptiste Rousseau (orientalist) (1780–1831), French orientalist